Air Vice-Marshal James Lindsay Gordon DFC (11 December 1892 – 3 March 1940) was a leading figure in the pre-World War II Royal Canadian Air Force and a pilot in the Royal Naval Air Service during World War I.

Career
James Lindsay Gordon was born on 11 December 1892 in Montreal, Quebec the son of Edward Percy Gordon and his wife Helen Lindsay. The young Gordon was educated at Montreal High School and McGill University.

In 1918, while a member of the Royal Air Force, Gordon was awarded the Distinguished Flying Cross. His citation was as follows:

From 1922 to 1924 Gordon was the first Director of the Royal Canadian Air Force.  Promoted to air vice-marshal in 1938, Gordon continued to serve until poor health forced him to retire in January 1940. Gordon died only a few weeks later in March of that year.

Notes

External links
Hall of Valour - Temple Du Courage - James Lindsay Gordon
Canada at War - Air Vice Marshal James Lindsay Gordon

|-

|-

|-

1892 births
1940 deaths
People from Montreal
Royal Canadian Air Force air marshals of World War II
Royal Air Force officers
Royal Naval Air Service personnel of World War I
Recipients of the Distinguished Flying Cross (United Kingdom)
Royal Naval Air Service aviators
McGill University alumni